Bjørnefossvatnet or Flatisvatnet is a lake in the northwestern part of the municipality of Rana in Nordland county, Norway. The glacial lake is also the headwaters of the Glomåga river which flows south into the lake Langvatnet.

See also
 List of lakes in Norway
 Geography of Norway

References

Rana, Norway
Lakes of Nordland